The 2010 Rhode Island Rams football team represented the University of Rhode Island in the 2010 NCAA Division I FCS football season as a member of the Colonial Athletic Association (CAA). The Rams were led by second year head coach Joe Trainer and played their home games at Meade Stadium. They finished the season with five wins and six losses (5–6, 4–4 in CAA play) and finished tied for in fifth place in conference.

Schedule

References

Rhode Island
Rhode Island Rams football seasons
Rhode Island Rams football